The Woods Hollow Formation is a geologic formation in Texas. It preserves fossils dating back to the Ordovician period.

See also

 List of fossiliferous stratigraphic units in Texas
 Paleontology in Texas

References
 

Geologic formations of Texas
Ordovician System of North America
Cambrian southern paleotropical deposits
Ordovician southern paleotropical deposits